Krishna or Krsna is a major deity in Hinduism.

Krsna may also refer to:

KRSNA (rapper), stage name stylised as KR$NA, formerly known as YoungProzpekt, Indian rapper and songwriter
Krsna Solo (born Amitav Sarkar), Indian music composer, singer-songwriter and a music producer

See also
Hare Krsna TV, an international media network and 24x7 free to air TV channel launched in India 
Kršna Glava, a village in the municipality of Ub, Serbia